Saint-Georges-de-Commiers is a commune in the Isère department in southeastern France. It is situated 20 km south of Grenoble.

Population

Sights

The small primitive Roman-style church of Saint-Georges was donated by Saint Hugues aux Chanoines d'Oulx in 1080. Its original aspects have endured the test of time. The arched porch has been preserved, as has the squared bell tower, which has two arched windows, and is capped with a tall spire. It was classified as a historical monument in 1908.

See also
Communes of the Isère department

References

External links
Official website

Communes of Isère